The afroalpine vlei rat (Otomys orestes) is a species of rodent in the family Muridae.
It is found in the high moorlands of Kenya.

Taxonomy 

In Musser and Carleton (2005), this species included a number of subspecies. 

Otomys thomasi (Thomas's vlei rat), which was initially described as a species by Osgood in 1910, was included under O. orestes in their work, alongside. However, Taylor et al. (2011) found that O. thomasi, O. zinki (Mount Kilimanjaro vlei rat) and others subspecies were distinct from O. orestes.

References

Taylor, P. & Maree, S. 2004.  Otomys orestes. 2006 IUCN Red List of Threatened Species. Downloaded on 9 July 2007.

Endemic fauna of Kenya
Otomys
Mammals described in 1900
Taxa named by Oldfield Thomas
Taxonomy articles created by Polbot